Farm to Market Roads in Texas are owned and maintained by the Texas Department of Transportation (TxDOT).

FM 1400

FM 1401

FM 1402

FM 1403

FM 1403 (1949)

The original FM 1403 was designated on July 14, 1949, from US 271 south of Gilmer, southeast to the Gregg County line. FM 1403 was cancelled on August 2, 1968, and redesignated as SH 300.

FM 1404

FM 1405

FM 1406

FM 1407

FM 1407 (1949)

The original FM 1407 was designated on July 15, 1949, from US 96 at Buna northwest  to a road intersection. FM 1407 was cancelled on October 28, 1953, and its mileage was transferred to FM 1004.

FM 1408

FM 1409

Farm to Market Road 1409 (FM 1409) is located in Liberty and Chambers counties. It runs from US 90 in Dayton to FM 565 west of Cove.

FM 1409 was designated on July 14, 1949, from US 90 in Dayton to Dayton Canal. On May 23, 1951, the road was extended south  to FM 565 at Winfree (now Old River-Winfree). On May 25, 2010, the designation was extended south  to another point on FM 565, but this was cancelled prior to the start of construction. On March 27, 2014, the extension was proposed again.

FM 1410

FM 1411

FM 1411 (1949)

FM 1411 was cancelled on December 18, 1959, and its mileage was transferred to FM 834.

FM 1412

Farm to Market Road 1412 (FM 1412) is located in Deaf Smith County. It runs from US 385 to SH 214.

FM 1412 was designated on November 30, 1949, from FM 1058, 23 miles west of Hereford, north and east  to SH 51 (now US 385). On December 1, 1953, the road was extended south  to the Parmer County line. On October 26, 1954, the road was extended south, east and south  to Friona. On December 12, 1956, the section from Friona to FM 290 was signed (but not designated) as SH 214. On August 29, 1990, this section was cancelled as the SH 214 designation became official.

FM 1412 (1949)

The original FM 1412 was proposed from US 59 in Cleveland northwest  to the San Jacinto County line. FM 1412 was cancelled on November 30, 1949, and removed from the highway system in exchange for extending FM 163. The route was restored as FM 2025 in 1952.

FM 1413

FM 1414

FM 1415

FM 1416

FM 1417

FM 1417 (1949)

The original FM 1417 was designated on July 14, 1949, from US 69 at Colmesneil southeast . On November 20, 1951, the road was extended  to a road intersection. On December 17, 1952, the road was extended to US 190. FM 1417 was cancelled on January 29, 1953, and transferred to FM 256.

FM 1418

FM 1419

Farm to Market Road 1419 (FM 1419) is located in Cameron County. It runs from SH 4 to SH 32.

FM 1419 as designated on July 15, 1949, from FM 511, 2.5 miles southeast of Brownsville, southeast  to South Point. On December 30, 1956, a 0.33 mile section from old SH 4 at 14th Street to new SH 4 at International Boulevard was returned to Brownsville. On June 30, 1995, the section from SH 4 southeast to UR 511 was transferred to UR 1419, but that section was transferred back to FM 1419 on November 15, 2018. On April 29, 2010, the route was shortened to SH 32: the section from 1.9 miles west of FM 3068 to FM 3068 and 0.4 mile north of Dockberry Road to 0.7 mile south of SH 4 were redesignated as SH 32, the section from FM 3068 to north of Dockberry Road was redesignated as FM 3550 and the section from 0.7 mile south of SH 4 to SH 4 was redesignated as FM 3551.

FM 1420

FM 1421

FM 1422

FM 1423

FM 1424

FM 1424 (1949)

The original FM 1424 was designated on July 14, 1949, from US 83, 0.8 mile west of Donna, south  to a road intersection. Two months later FM 1424 was cancelled and became a portion of FM 1423.

FM 1425

FM 1426

FM 1427

FM 1428

FM 1428 (1949)

The original FM 1428 was designated on July 15, 1949, from US 83 in Mercedes, south  to US 281. FM 1428 was cancelled on July 16, 1951, and became a portion of FM 491.

FM 1429

FM 1429 (1949)

The original FM 1429 was designated on July 15, 1949, from FM 755 west and northwest  to the Jim Hogg County line. Four months later FM 1429 was cancelled and became a portion of FM 1017.

FM 1430

RM 1431

FM 1431 (1949)

The original FM 1431 was designated on July 15, 1949, from FM 755 east to the Hidalgo County line at La Reforma. Four months later FM 1431 was cancelled and became a portion of FM 1017.

FM 1432

FM 1432 (1949)

The original FM 1432 was designated on July 14, 1949, from US 77, 1.3 miles south of Raymondville, west  to a road intersection. On December 2, 1953, the road was extended east  to FM 2099. On October 26, 1954, the road was extended west  to FM 1015. FM 1432 was cancelled on June 1, 1964, and transferred to FM 490.

FM 1433

FM 1434

Farm to Market Road 1434 (FM 1434) is located in Johnson County. It runs from US 67 west of Cleburne to PR 21, with a spur connection to Lake Pat Cleburne.

FM 1434 was designated on December 17, 1952, from SH 171 south of Cleburne southwest  to a road intersection. On March 1, 1960, the road was extended southwest  to another road intersection, and southwest  to yet another road intersection on August 1, 1963. On July 30, 1964, the northern terminus was relocated to US 67: a  section from the junction of old and new FM 1434 northeast to Cleburne Reservoir (now Lake Pat Cleburne) became FM Spur 1434 (FS 1434), a  section through the reservoir area was removed from the highway system, and a  section from SH 171 at Cleburne southwest to the reservoir was renumbered as FM 1718. On June 1, 1966, the road was extended west and northwest  to PR 21. On January 2, 2006, a 0.14 miles section of FS 1434 was removed from the highway system and returned to the city of Cleburne.

FM 1434 (1949)

The original FM 1434 was designated from SH 41, 8 miles east of the Edwards County line, south . FM 1434 was cancelled on December 17, 1952, and transferred to FM 336 (now RM 336).

FM 1435

FM 1436

FM 1437

Farm to Market Road 1437 (FM 1437) is located in Hudspeth County.

FM 1437 was designated on June 21, 1949, from US 62 to Dell City. It was extended to its current northern terminus on September 29, 1954.

FM 1438

FM 1439

FM 1440

FM 1441

Farm to Market Road 1441 (FM 1441) is located in Bastrop County. It runs from SH 95 to SH 21.

FM 1441 was designated on July 31, 1964, from SH 95 eastward 2.8 miles to Lake Bastrop. On July 11, 1968, FM 1441 was extended east to SH 21, completing its current route.

FM 1441 (1949)

On May 23, 1951, the road was extended north and east  to another road intersection. On December 17, 1952, the road was extended east  to SH 70. On October 26, 1954, the road was extended north and west  to FM 28. FM 1441 was cancelled on November 1, 1960, and transferred to FM 193.

FM 1442

FM 1442 (1949)

FM 1442 was cancelled on November 20, 1951, and eliminated from the highway system.

FM 1442 (1951)

The next use of the FM 1442 designation was in Collingsworth County, from FM 338 west  to a road intersection west of Buck School. On October 31, 1958, the road was extended west and north to SH 203 at Quail. FM 1442 was cancelled on November 26, 1958, and transferred to FM 1056.

FM 1443

FM 1444

FM 1445

FM 1446

FM 1447

FM 1448

FM 1449

FM 1450

FM 1450 (1949)

The original FM 1450 was designated on July 21, 1949, from SH 14 in Wortham west  to the Freestone County line. Seven months later FM 1450 was cancelled and became a portion of FM 27.

FM 1451

FM 1452

FM 1452 (1949)

The original FM 1452 was designated on July 22, 1949, from the Wharton County line, southeast  via Pledger to an intersection with SH 36 at West Columbia. Two months later FM 1452 was cancelled and became a portion of FM 1301.

FM 1453

FM 1454

FM 1455

FM 1456

FM 1457

FM 1458

Farm to Market Road 1458 (FM 1458) is located in Austin and Waller counties. It runs from FM 359 at Pattison west and south to FM 1093.

FM 1458 was designated on July 22, 1949, from US 90 (now I-10) south  via Frydek to a county road. On September 20, 1961, the road was extended south  to FM 1093. On January 20, 1966, the road was extended north to the Brazos River, replacing Spur 99 (formerly SH 249). On July 11, 1968, a Farm to Market Road was designated across the Brazos River. On September 11, 1968, the road was extended east and south  to FM 359 at Pattison, replacing FM 2572.

FM 1459

FM 1460

Farm to Market Road 1460 (FM 1460) is located in Williamson County.

FM 1460 was designated on October 31, 1958, from SH 29 in Georgetown southward to US 79. On October 29, 1992, FM 1460 was designated to be rerouted west to RM 2243 and Business Interstate 35-M (now Spur 26).

FM 1460 (1949)

The original FM 1460 was designated on July 22, 1949, from FM 523 in Velasco to 0.2 miles south of the Intracoastal Canal. On January 12, 1950, the road was extended across the Intracoastal Canal, replacing SH 332. On September 27, 1954, the road was adjusted to begin northeast of Velasco and to end at a road intersection. Two days later the road was extended northwest to SH 288. On October 15, 1954, the road was extended northwest to FM 521, replacing FM 1605 and creating a concurrency with SH 288. FM 1460 was cancelled on October 24, 1956, and transferred back to SH 332.

FM 1461

Farm to Market Road 1461 (FM 1461) is located in Collin County.

FM 1461 was designated on March 26, 1953, from SH 289 south of Celina eastward to what was then FM 1828 (the designation of the north-south section of FM 1461 at the time). On May 20, 1955, FM 1461 was extended south replacing FM 1828 to US 380 (University Drive) (then SH 24). On August 30, 2001, the section south of County Road 123/164 (Bloomdale Road) was given to the city of McKinney. FM 1461 is known as Frontier Pkwy in Celina/Prosper, Laud Howell Pkwy in McKinney for west/east, and Lake Forest Dr in McKinney for north/south.

FM 1461 (1949)

The original FM 1461 was designated on July 22, 1949, from SH 35 in Alvin to FM 518 south of Friendswood. FM 1461 was canceled on January 16, 1953, and transferred to FM 528.

FM 1462

Farm to Market Road 1462 (FM 1462) is located in Brazoria and Fort Bend counties. It runs from SH 36 in Damon to SH 35 in Alvin.

FM 1462 was designated on July 14, 1949, from SH 288 at Rosharon to SH 35 south of Alvin. On September 27, 1960, the road was extended west  to the Brazos River. On October 10, 1961, the road was extended to SH 36 north of Damon, replacing a section of FM 762.

FM 1463

Farm to Market Road 1463 (FM 1463) is located in Fort Bend County.

The southern terminus of FM 1463 is at an intersection with FM 1093 and FM 359. The route travels north through rural areas of Fort Bend County before entering Katy. It has a junction with I-10 at exit 740. After crossing the interstate, the route continues through Katy, passing Katy High School, before reaching its northern terminus at US 90 near the tripoint with Waller and Harris counties.

FM 1463 was designated on July 22, 1949, along the current route, to connect Katy to the community of Flewellen. The community, near the intersection with FM 1093 and FM 359, existed at least through the 1980s.

FM 1464

FM 1465

FM 1465 (1949)

The first use of the FM 1465 designation was in Frio County, from US 81 in Pearsall northwest  towards Batesville. On December 22, 1949, the road was extended  to a road intersection, and was extended another  to Frio Town on December 18, 1951. FM 1465 was cancelled on December 17, 1952, and transferred to FM 140.

FM 1465 (1952)

The next use of the FM 1465 designation was in Fayette County from SH 159 east  to the Colorado County line. FM 1465 was cancelled on October 28, 1953, and transferred to FM 1291.

FM 1466

FM 1466 (1949)

FM 1466 was cancelled on February 21, 1952, and eliminated from the highway system. The route became FM 1266 once right of way was acquired.

FM 1467

FM 1468

FM 1469

FM 1469 (1949)

The original FM 1469 was designated on July 22, 1949, from SH 60 at Wadsworth east   to a road intersection. On November 20, 1951, the road was extended northeast   to a road intersection. On December 17, 1952, the road was extended northeast  to FM 457. FM 1469 was cancelled on January 16, 1953, and transferred to FM 521.

FM 1470

FM 1470 (1949)

FM 1470 was cancelled on November 21, 1957, and transferred to FM 836.

FM 1471

FM 1472

FM 1472 (1949)

The original FM 1472 was designated on July 20, 1948, from US 82 east of Crosbyton north to Wake School. FM 1472 was cancelled on November 1, 1954, and became a portion of FM 28.

FM 1473

FM 1473 (1949)

The original FM 1473 was designated on July 22, 1949, from US 290 northwest to FM 1098. Two months later FM 1473 was cancelled and became a portion of FM 362.

RM 1474

FM 1474 (1949)

FM 1474 was designated on July 14, 1949, from US 83, 5 miles south of Brownwood, east and south  to the Mills County line. FM 1474 was cancelled on January 6, 1953, and transferred to FM 45.

FM 1475

FM 1475 (1949)

The original FM 1475 was designated on July 15, 1949, from US 67/US 84 in Santa Anna southeast  to a road intersection. Eight months later FM 1475 was cancelled and became a portion of FM 1176.

FM 1476

FM 1477

FM 1478

Farm to Market Road 1478 (FM 1478) is located in Lampasas and Burnet counties. It runs from FM 580 in Lampasas to Naruna.

FM 1478 was designated on July 15, 1949, from FM 580 in Lampasas southwest  to the Burnet County line. On February 26, 1968, the road was extended north 3 blocks due to relocation of FM 580. Five months later the road was extended southwest  to Naruna and changed to RM 1478, but was changed back to FM 1478 on May 5, 1992.

FM 1479

FM 1479 (1949)

The original FM 1479 was designated on July 14, 1949, from FM 45 east  to a road intersection at Locker. FM 1479 was cancelled on September 21, 1955, and transferred to FM 500.

FM 1480

FM 1481

FM 1482

FM 1483

FM 1484

FM 1485

Farm to Market Road 1485 (FM 1485) is located in Montgomery County. It travels southeast, ending at Loop 494, in New Caney.

On July 22, 1949, the first FM 1485 designation was created. Another  was added on September 27, 1951, when FM 1485 was extended to replace FM 1773, moving the eastern terminus to the Harris–Montgomery county line. On June 1, 1965, the road was lengthened once more by adding  in Harris County.

The Texas Department of Transportation (TxDOT) re-described the routing of FM 1485 in their Highway Designation File on October 2, 1970.

Junction list

FM 1486

Farm to Market Road 1486 (FM 1486) is located in Grimes and Montgomery counties. It runs from SH 30 at Shiro to FM 1774 northwest of Magnolia.

FM 1486 was designated on July 22, 1949, from SH 105 at Dobbin northwest to Dacus. On August 22, 1951, the road was extended south  to FM 1774. On November 2, 1955, the road was extended to FM 149 at Richards, replacing FM 1776. On October 31, 1958, the road was extended north  to SH 45 (now SH 30) at Shiro, creating a concurrency with FM 149.

FM 1487

FM 1488

Farm to Market Road 1488 (FM 1488) is located in Greater Houston. Its western terminus is at an intersection with Business U.S. Highway 290 in Hempstead and travels east-northeast, ending at I-45 between The Woodlands and Conroe.  The road travels through rural parts of Waller, Harris, and Montgomery counties and directly through the town of Magnolia.

FM 1488 as designated on July 22, 1949, from US 290 (now a business route) to FM 1098. On December 27, 1952, FM 1488 was extended to US 75 (now I-45). On July 11, 1968, part of the old location of FM 149 was transferred to FM 1488. On May 30, 2019, a proposed bypass around Magnolia was designated; when the bypass is completed, the old route of FM 1488 will be redesignated as Business FM 1488-P. Part of the bypass will be concurrent with the extension of SH 249, which is currently under construction.

Junction list

FM 1489

Farm to Market Road 1489 (FM 1489) is located in Fort Bend and Waller counties. It runs from US 90 near Brookshire to FM 1952.

FM 1489 was designated on July 22, 1949, from US 90, 0.8 mile west of Brookshire southwest  to the Fort Bend County line. On December 17, 1952, the road was extended south  to FM 1093. On July 30, 1963, the road was extended south  to SH 36 at Orchard, replacing FM 2758. On September 1, 1968, the road was extended south  to FM 1952.

Junction list

FM 1490

FM 1491

RM 1492

FM 1492 (1949)

The original FM 1492 was designated on August 25, 1949, from US 77, 3.5 miles south of Waxahachie, southeast  to Nash. On October 25, 1955, the road was extended southeast  to SH 34 at Avalon. FM 1492 was cancelled on June 1, 1962, and transferred to FM 55.

FM 1493

FM 1494

FM 1495

Farm to Market Road 1495 (FM 1495) is located in Brazoria County.

The northern terminus of FM 1495 is at FM 523, south of plants belonging to the Dow Chemical Company. Taking a southeast-to-south route, the highway crosses the old Brazos River, passing the Storm Surge Lock to the west of the bridge. Becoming Navigation Boulevard, FM 1495 continues through the east end of Freeport, passing the Port of Freeport and intersecting with SH 36 and SH 288 (the concurrent highways end at FM 1495). Then making a turn to the southeast, the highway crosses the Intracoastal Waterway, giving drivers a view of the beach and the Gulf of Mexico. The southern terminus of FM 1495 is at the end of the bridge with a four-way stop at County Road 723, Quintana's main road. Continuing past the stop sign takes drivers to Bryan Beach.

FM 1495 was designated on September 21, 1955, from SH 36 to the Gulf of Mexico. On May 6, 1964, the route was extended north around the eastern edge of Freeport to its current northern terminus at FM 523.

FM 1495 once crossed the Intracoastal Waterway via a swing bridge. The bridge was replaced in 2003 due to concerns of Hurricane Evacuation and Emergency Personnel.

FM 1495 (1949)

The original FM 1495 was designated on August 25, 1949, from US 190 west  to a road intersection in Lampasas County. On October 26, 1954, the designation was extended southwest to FM 580. FM 1495 was cancelled on September 2, 1955, and the mileage was transferred to FM 581.

FM 1496

FM 1497

FM 1498

FM 1499

Notes

References

+14
Farm to market roads 1400
Farm to market roads 1400